Bernadette Païx, born 19 March 1950 in Bourbaki (Algeria), is a French politician.

She was the substitute candidate for Philippe Douste-Blazy in the 2002 national assembly election for Haute-Garonne's 1st constituency and became the deputy on 1 May 2004 after he was appointed Minister of Health.

She was a member of the national assembly study group on Tibet.
She did not contest the 2007 election.

References

External links
 Her page on the site of the National Assembly

Women members of the National Assembly (France)
Deputies of the 12th National Assembly of the French Fifth Republic
Living people
1950 births
People from Tissemsilt Province
21st-century French women politicians